Two vessels of the United States Navy have been named USS Oklahoma City, after Oklahoma City, Oklahoma.

 The first , originally CL-91, was a light cruiser in service from 1945 to 1947, then converted to a guided missile cruiser between 1957 and 1960, continuing in that service until 1979.
 The second  is a  nuclear attack submarine commissioned in 1988.

See also 
 

United States Navy ship names